Larry Robinson (born January 11, 1968) is an American former professional basketball player.

Basketball career
Born in Bossier City, Louisiana, he played collegiately for two seasons (1986–88) at Eastern Oklahoma State College (community college) and then two seasons (1988–90) at the Centenary College of Louisiana.

He later played professionally with eight different NBA teams (Washington Bullets, Golden State Warriors, Boston Celtics, Houston Rockets, Vancouver Grizzlies, Atlanta Hawks, Cleveland Cavaliers, and New York Knicks) intermittently from 1990-01 to 2001-02. He also played in CBA, IBL, USBL, and abroad in France, Spain, the Philippines, Venezuela, and Puerto Rico.

Having played 89 games in parts of seven seasons, Robinson has an NBA record for fewest games played by players with at least six years of NBA experience.

Personal
Robinson transferred to Centenary, which is the same alma mater as that of his cousin Robert Parish.

As of September 2010, Robinson worked for Horseshoe Casino and Hotel in Bossier City, Louisiana as Director of Player Development.

Career statistics

NBA

Source

Regular season

|-
| align="left" | 
| align="left" | Golden State
| 24 || 0 || 7.1 || .407 || – || .533 || 1.0 || .5 || .4 || .0 || 2.3
|-
| align="left" | 
| align="left" | Washington
| 12 || 10 || 21.3 || .418 || .000 || .583 || 2.3 || 2.0 || .6 || .0 || 6.9
|-
| align="left" | 
| align="left" | Boston
| 1 || 0 || 6.0 || .200 || – || – || 2.0 || 1.0 || .0 || .0 || 2.0
|-
| align="left" | 
| align="left" | Washington
| 4 || 0 || 8.3 || .375 || .000 || .600 || .8 || .8 || .3 || .3 || 3.8
|-
| style="text-align:left;background:#afe6ba;"| †
| align="left" | Houston
| 6 || 0 || 9.2 || .500 || .250 || .375 || 1.7 || 1.0 || 1.2 || .0 || 4.2
|-
| align="left" | 
| align="left" | Vancouver
| 6 || 0 || 6.8 || .316 || .500 || 1.000 || 2.0 || .2 || .7 || .0 || 2.8
|-
| align="left" | 
| align="left" | Cleveland
| 1 || 0 || 1.0 || – || – || – || .0 || .0 || .0 || .0 || .0
|-
| align="left" | 
| align="left" | Atlanta
| 33 || 1 || 19.1 || .364 || .379 || .875 || 2.6 || 1.1 || .8 || .1 || 6.0
|-
| align="left" | 
| align="left" | New York
| 2 || 0 || 5.0 || .250 || .500 || – || 1.0 || .0 || .0 || .0 || 1.5
|- class="sortbottom"
| style="text-align:center;" colspan="2"| Career
| 89 || 11 || 13.5 || .384 || .373 || .667 || 1.9 || .9 || .6 || .0 || 4.5

References

External links
NBA.com player profile
NBA stats @ basketballreference.com
@ basketpedya.com 

1968 births
Living people
Airline High School alumni
African-American basketball players
American expatriate basketball people in Canada
American expatriate basketball people in France
American expatriate basketball people in the Philippines
American expatriate basketball people in Spain
American expatriate basketball people in Venezuela
American men's basketball players
Atlanta Hawks players
Basketball players from Louisiana
Boston Celtics players
CB Girona players
Centenary Gentlemen basketball players
Cleveland Cavaliers players
Florida Beachdogs players
Golden State Warriors players
Houston Rockets players
Junior college men's basketball players in the United States
Liga ACB players
New York Knicks players
Panteras de Miranda players
Philippine Basketball Association imports
Point guards
Rapid City Thrillers players
Richmond Rhythm players
San Miguel Beermen players
Shooting guards
Sportspeople from Bossier City, Louisiana
Undrafted National Basketball Association players
Vancouver Grizzlies players
Washington Bullets players
Yakima Sun Kings players
TNT Tropang Giga players
21st-century African-American people
20th-century African-American sportspeople